Dancing with the Devil may refer to:

 Dancing with the Devil... the Art of Starting Over, a 2021 album by Demi Lovato
 "Dancing with the Devil" (song), a 2021 song by Demi Lovato
 Demi Lovato: Dancing with the Devil, a 2021 documentary television series
 Dancing with the Devil, a 2001 album by Seann Scott
 "Dancing with the Devil", a song by Krewella from Get Wet
 "Dancing with the Devil", a song by Lovebites from Electric Pentagram

See also
 Dance with the devil (disambiguation)